Bayview is a census-designated place in Contra Costa County, California. Bayview sits at an elevation of 36 feet (11 m). The 2010 United States census reported Bayview's population was 1,754.  Prior to 2010, Bayview was part of the Bayview-Montalvin CDP and then separated into the two individual communities of Bayview and Montalvin Manor for the census.

Geography

Demographics

At the 2010 census Bayview had a population of 1,754. The racial makeup of Bayview was 871 (49.7%) White, 186 (10.6%) African American, 18 (1.0%) Native American, 369 (21.0%) Asian, 9 (0.5%) Pacific Islander, 179 (10.2%) from other races, and 122 (7.0%) from two or more races. Hispanic or Latino of any race were 521 people (29.7%).

The census reported that 1,746 people (99.5% of the population) lived in households, 8 (0.5%) lived in non-institutionalized group quarters, and no one was institutionalized.

There were 575 households, 222 (38.6%) had children under the age of 18 living in them, 342 (59.5%) were opposite-sex married couples living together, 71 (12.3%) had a female householder with no husband present, 41 (7.1%) had a male householder with no wife present.  There were 31 (5.4%) unmarried opposite-sex partnerships, and 5 (0.9%) same-sex married couples or partnerships. 93 households (16.2%) were one person and 41 (7.1%) had someone living alone who was 65 or older. The average household size was 3.04.  There were 454 families (79.0% of households); the average family size was 3.38.

The age distribution was 413 people (23.5%) under the age of 18, 136 people (7.8%) aged 18 to 24, 442 people (25.2%) aged 25 to 44, 473 people (27.0%) aged 45 to 64, and 290 people (16.5%) who were 65 or older.  The median age was 41.0 years. For every 100 females, there were 92.1 males.  For every 100 females age 18 and over, there were 93.2 males.

There were 591 housing units at an average density of ,of which 575 were occupied, 479 (83.3%) by the owners and 96 (16.7%) by renters.  The homeowner vacancy rate was 1.4%; the rental vacancy rate was 3.0%.  1,402 people (79.9% of the population) lived in owner-occupied housing units and 344 people (19.6%) lived in rental housing units.

Education
It is in the West Contra Costa Unified School District.

References

Census-designated places in Contra Costa County, California
Census-designated places in California